The Royal Brunei Armed Forces (RBAF) is the military of the sultanate nation of Brunei Darussalam.  In addition to the Royal Brunei Armed Forces, Brunei also hosts bases for the British Army and the Singapore Armed Forces.

Royal Brunei Armed Forces

It comprises the Land Forces, the Air Force, the Navy, Support Services, and the Training Institute.

Foreign military forces

British Garrison Brunei

A Gurkha Battalion from the British Army has been maintained in Brunei at the request of the Sultan of Brunei subsequent to the 1962 Brunei Revolt.  This British Army detachment constitutes the most potent part of Brunei's defences.

Singapore Armed Forces
Singapore also maintains a training establishment in Brunei, known as the Jalan Aman Camp and operates support helicopters mainly to transport the soldiers to Lakiun Camp in Temburong District for jungle training.

The other Singapore military establishment in Brunei is the Lakiun Camp in Temburong.  This provides jungle training for the Singapore Armed Forces (SAF) in the interior of Temburong.

References

External links
The British Army in Brunei — British Army official website

Military of Brunei
Military of Singapore
British Army deployments
Brunei–United Kingdom relations